A locality of Mexico is a distinct settlement.  The definition is:

A locality (localidad), may be a city, Villa (población), Pueblo (población rural), ranchería, congregación (población) or ejido.

All cities are a single locality.  Note that in Mexico's case, a municipality is not a city, a city is most often inside a municipality.

According to Instituto Nacional de Estadística y Geografía (INEGI) it is:

All places with one or more dwellings, who may be inhabited or not, and can be classed as urban or rural.

See also
 Settlement classification in Mexico

Refs

Subdivisions of Mexico
Populated places in Mexico